Joseph Fratrel, born at Épinal in 1730, was a French scholar of Baudouin in Paris, and distinguished himself as a painter and etcher. He was court painter of King Stanislaus and the Elector-Palatine Charles Theodore: in the Darmstadt Museum is a portrait of the Electress. He died at Mannheim on May 15, 1783. The following are his best-known works:

Joseph's Dream; after L. Krahe. 
The Miller's Son.
St. Nicholas.

References

1730 births
1783 deaths
18th-century French painters
French male painters
People from Épinal
Court painters
18th-century French male artists